Michael Vincent Noel James Kenny (born 19 June 1964, in Lower Hutt) is a former heavyweight boxer from New Zealand, who won the gold medal in the men's super heavyweight (+ 91 kg) division at  the 1990 Commonwealth Games. He also represented his native country at 1984 Summer Olympics in Los Angeles, California, falling in the second round to Dodovic Owini from Uganda.

References
 New Zealand Olympic Committee
 New Zealand National Library photograph archive

1964 births
Living people
Super-heavyweight boxers
Boxers at the 1984 Summer Olympics
Olympic boxers of New Zealand
Commonwealth Games gold medallists for New Zealand
Boxers at the 1990 Commonwealth Games
Sportspeople from Lower Hutt
New Zealand male boxers
Commonwealth Games medallists in boxing
Medallists at the 1990 Commonwealth Games